MAD Lions is a Spanish esports organisation owned by OverActive Media. Its main League of Legends team, which was rebranded from Splyce, competes in Europe's top-level league for the game, the LEC. Its secondary League of Legends team competes in Spain's SuperLiga, the top three teams of which qualify for the prestigious European Masters tournament.

MAD Lions won their first LEC title on 11 April 2021, after reverse sweeping Rogue in the spring finals.

League of Legends

History

Before joining the LEC
MAD Lions was founded on 31 August 2017 to compete in the Spanish professional League of Legends scene. The team began competing in Spain's SuperLiga Orange (formerly División de Honor) and grew in popularity as they consistently topped the region, qualifying for the prestigious European Masters tournament thrice and winning the tournament in their second appearance in summer 2018. The organisation also began expanding globally, sponsoring several teams in Latin America under the MAD Lions brand.

In May 2019 it was announced that MAD Lions had been acquired by OverActive Media. The company later announced its intentions to dissolve its other esports subsidiary, Splyce, by the end of the year. Splyce's League of Legends team subsequently assumed the MAD Lions brand in November 2019, while MAD Lions' original League of Legends team renamed to MAD Lions Madrid.

2020 season

MAD Lions' inaugural LEC roster for the 2020 Spring Split consisted of four rookies—Orome, Shad0w, Carzzy, and Kaiser—and one former member of Splyce, Humanoid. Despite expectations that the team would only qualify for the losers' bracket of playoffs or not qualify at all, MAD Lions finished fourth in the regular season and secured a spot in the winners' bracket. G2 Esports selected MAD Lions as their opponent for the first round of playoffs, and were expected to win against MAD Lions as favourites to win the spring season. However, MAD Lions were able to defeat G2 Esports in a close-fought series, knocking the latter into the losers' bracket. MAD Lions were then themselves knocked down to the losers' bracket after being swept by Fnatic in the second round of the winners' bracket. MAD Lions' inaugural split ended when they lost to a more well-prepared G2 Esports in the final round of the losers' bracket.

MAD Lions retained their entire spring lineup for the 2020 LEC Summer Split. The team finished second in the regular season and began playoffs in the winners' bracket. MAD Lions lost their rematch against G2 Esports in the first round of the winners' bracket, and were forced to climb through the losers' bracket once again. MAD Lions managed to defeat Schalke in the second round of the losers' bracket, but were swept by Rogue in the third round and ended fourth.

MAD Lions' fourth-place finish in the summer split qualified them for the play-in stage of the 2020 World Championship. As a team from a major region, MAD Lions was expected by many analysts to qualify for the main event. However, MAD Lions placed fourth out of five teams in their group and were eliminated from Worlds contention by Turkey's SuperMassive in the knockout stage.

2021 season

Prior to the 2021 LEC Spring Split, Orome and Shad0w were replaced with Armut and Elyoya respectively, both of whom were making their debut in the LEC. Armut was previously the top laner for SuperMassive, the team which eliminated MAD Lions from the 2020 World Championship. MAD Lions finished third in the regular season and began in the winners' bracket once again. MAD Lions defeated Rogue in the first round of the winners' bracket, qualifying for the second round. There, MAD Lions defeated G2 Esports and advanced to their first LEC finals. Despite trailing 0–2, MAD Lions managed to reverse sweep Rogue in a closely fought finals, claiming their first LEC title.

Roster

Tournament results

Valorant

Roster

Notes

References

External links
 

2017 establishments in Spain
Esports teams based in Spain
Esports teams established in 2017
League of Legends European Championship teams
Valorant teams